Guild is a surname. Notable people with the surname include:

Alan Guild (born 1947), Scottish footballer
Ben Guild (1924-2003), American microbiologist and writer
Henry Rice Guild, American lawyer
Ken Guild, Scottish politician
Nicholas Guild, American writer
Nigel Guild (born 1949), British Royal Navy admiral
Shirin Guild (born 1946), British Iranian fashion designer
Tricia Guild, British designer
William L. Guild (1910–1993), American lawyer and jurist